The 2022–23 season is PAS Giannina F.C.'s 27th competitive season in the top flight of Greek football, 12th season in the Super League Greece, and 57th year in existence as a football club. They also compete in the Greek Cup.

Players 
updated 27 February 2023

International players

Foreign players

Personnel

Management

Coaching staff

Medical staff

Academy

Transfers

Summer

In

Out

Winter

In

Out

Pre-season and friendlies

Competitions

Super League 1

League table

Fixtures

Greek Cup

Fifth round

References

External links 

 official website

PAS Giannina F.C. seasons
PAS Giannina